Terrance Sanders (born November 23, 1983) is an American football defensive back who is currently a free agent. He was signed by the Utah Blaze as an undrafted free agent in 2008. He played college football at Eastern Illinois.

Early life
Sanders attended Palmetto High School in Palmetto, Florida for his first three years of high school. As a senior, Sanders transferred to Manatee High School in Bradenton, Florida. He was joining his uncle, who was the defensive backs coach at Manatee, but the Florida High School Athletic Association ruled that Sanders was ineligible to play because he was recruited to transfer to Manatee.

College career
Sanders' transfer forcing him to sit out his senior season, might have cost him a chance and playing Division I-A football, and he enrolled at Eastern Illinois University.

Professional career
After going undrafted in the 2007 NFL Draft, Sanders sat out a year of football, before signing with the Utah Blaze in 2008. After just three games with the Blaze, Sanders played the rest of the 2008 season, and the 2009 season with the Boise Burn of af2. Sanders return to the Arena Football League in 2010 with the Arizona Rattlers. Sanders would sign with the Spokane Shock in 2011, where he would play until 2014, turning himself into one of the best kick returners in the AFL, winning the J. Lewis Small Playmaker of the Year Award in 2014. Sanders left the Shock during the 2015 offseason and was assigned to the Jacksonville Sharks.

References

External links
 Just Sports Stats
 Arena Football League bio

1983 births
Living people
Sportspeople from Bradenton, Florida
Players of American football from Florida
African-American players of American football
American football defensive backs
Eastern Illinois Panthers football players
Utah Blaze players
Boise Burn players
Arizona Rattlers players
Spokane Shock players
Jacksonville Sharks players
21st-century African-American sportspeople
20th-century African-American people